West Jefferson is a town in Jefferson County, Alabama, United States. It incorporated in October 1964. At the 2010 census the population was 338, down from 344 in 2000.

Geography
West Jefferson is located at  (33.649773, -87.071222).

Demographics

2020 census

As of the 2020 United States census, there were 417 people, 193 households, and 127 families residing in the town.

2000 census
As of the census of 2000, there were 344 people, 138 households, and 108 families residing in the town. The racial makeup of the town was 99.71% White, and 0.29% from two or more races.

There were 138 households, out of which 30.4% had children under the age of 18 living with them, 63.0% were married couples living together, 7.2% had a female householder with no husband present, and 21.7% were non-families. 18.8% of all households were made up of individuals, and 11.6% had someone living alone who was 65 years of age or older. The average household size was 2.49 and the average family size was 2.82.

In the town, the population was spread out, with 23.0% under the age of 18, 7.0% from 18 to 24, 28.2% from 25 to 44, 24.7% from 45 to 64, and 17.2% who were 65 years of age or older. The median age was 40 years. For every 100 females, there were 95.5 males. For every 100 females age 18 and over, there were 96.3 males.

The median income for a household in the town was $47,813, and the median income for a family was $53,750. Males had a median income of $36,406 versus $30,000 for females. The per capita income for the town was $19,256. About 1.8% of families and 2.6% of the population were below the poverty line, including none of those under the age of eighteen or sixty-five or over.

References

Towns in Jefferson County, Alabama
Towns in Alabama
Birmingham metropolitan area, Alabama